The Church of St Peter is a Church of England parish church in Hilton in the borough of Stockton-on-Tees and in the county of North Yorkshire. The church dates from the 12th century and is a grade I listed building.

History
The Church of St Peter was built in the 12th century and is a two-cell Norman church. There has only been limited alterations to the building over time. The majority of the windows date to the 18th century but a lancet window in the chancel dates to the 13th century.

On 23 June 1966, the church was designated a grade I listed building.

References

External links
 Parish website
 A Church Near You entry

Church of England church buildings in North Yorkshire
12th-century church buildings in England
Grade I listed churches in North Yorkshire